The ANSI 834 EDI Enrollment Implementation Format is a standard file format in the United States for electronically exchanging health plan enrollment data between employers and health insurance carriers. 

The Health Insurance Portability and Accountability Act (HIPAA) requires that all health plans or health insurance carriers accept a standard enrollment format: ANSI 834A Version 5010.

An 834 file contains a string of data elements, with each representing a fact, such as a subscriber’s name, hire date, etc. The entire string is called a data segment. 

The 834 is used to transfer enrollment information from the sponsor of the insurance coverage, benefits, or policy to a payer. The intent of this implementation guide is to meet the health care industry's specific need for the initial enrollment and subsequent maintenance of individuals who are enrolled in insurance products. This implementation guide specifically addresses the enrollment and maintenance of health care products only. One or more separate guides may be developed for life, flexible spending, and retirement products.

An example layout of an ANSI 834A Version 5010 file is shown below:
INS*Y*18*030*XN*A*E**FT~
REF*0F*152239999~
REF*1L*Blue~
DTP*336*D8*20070101~
NM1*IL*1*BLUTH*LUCILLE****34*152239999~
N3*224 N DES PLAINES*6TH FLOOR~
N4*CHICAGO*IL*60661*USA~
DMG*D8*19720121*F*M~
HD*030**VIS**EMP~
DTP*348*D8*20111016~
INS*N*19*030*XN*A*E***N*N~
REF*0F*152239999~
REF*1L*Blue~
DTP*357*D8*20111015~
NM1*IL*1*BLUTH*BUSTER~
N3*224 N DES PLAINES*6TH FLOOR~
N4*CHICAGO*IL*60661*USA~
DMG*D8*19911015*M~
HD*030**VIS~
DTP*348*D8*20110101~
DTP*349*D8*20111015~

See also
 X12 Document List

References

 "Guardian Electronic User Guide 834 Enrollment and Maintenance"
 "EDI 834 Benefit Enrollment and Maintenance"

Data management
Health insurance in the United States
Computer file formats
American National Standards Institute standards